Wangmo is a Tibetan name. People with this name include:
Dechen Wangmo (Tibetan Buddhist) (died 2011), daughter of a Tibetan noble family
Dechen Wangmo (politician) (born ), Bhutanese politician
Dorji Wangmo (born 1955), Queen Mother of Bhutan
Dorjee Wangmo (born ), Bhutanese politician
Kezang Wangmo, Bhutanese actress, poet, singer and dancer 
Kelsang Wangmo (born Kerstin Brummenbaum), German Buddhist nun
Kunzang Dekyong Wangmo (1892–1940), Tibetan Buddhist teacher
Mayeum Choying Wangmo Dorji (1897–1994), mother of Queen Grandmother Ashi Kesang Choden of Bhutan
Nilza Wangmo (born ), Indian restaurateur from Ladakh
Tamdrin Wangmo Kelzang Chokyi Nyima (1836–1896), Tibetan Buddhist teacher
Tashi Wangmo (born ), Bhutanese politician
Tsering Wangmo Dhompa (born 1969), Tibetan poet

See also
 Wangmo County in China

Dzongkha-language surnames
Tibetan names
Dzongkha-language given names
Surnames of Bhutanese origin